8 First Dates is a 2012 Russian-Ukrainian romantic comedy directed by David Dodson and Aleksandr Malyarevsky. It stars Oksana Akinshina and Volodymyr Zelenskyy.

Plot
Vera and Nikita do not know each other, and the only thing they have in common is the fact that they chose the same place to celebrate their success in their personal lives. Vera is a successful TV presenter of her own talk show and is about to get married, her significant other is Konstantin, a famous tennis player. Nikita is a veterinarian high in demand, who made a marriage proposal to Ilona, a plastic surgeon. Everything is going well for them, they are happy, their friends support their choice, but everything changes one morning when Vera and Nikita wake up in the same bed. Deciding that this is a result of wild fun, they run away in different directions, hoping to forget everything as a bad dream.

But the next morning everything repeats, they wake up again in the same bed, in the same Dream House, although each of them knows for sure that they fell asleep at home. This continues for several more days. Some mysterious forces all the time bring them together, ruining their privacy, or perhaps indicating that they are made for each other.

Cast
Oksana Akinshina as Vera Kazantseva
Volodymyr Zelenskyy as Nikita  Sokolov
Ekaterina Varnava as Ilona
Denis Nikiforov as Konstantin
Olesya Zheleznyak as Zinaida Ivanovna, manager
Yevgeny Koshevoy as taxi driver
Svetlana Khodchenkova as passenger in a taxi
Victor Vasilyev as Alexey
Soso Pavliashvili as cameo (singer at the festival)
 Gorod 312 as cameo 
  Kostya Nakonechny as Kolya
 Igor Jijikine as Kolya's father
 Yelena Kondulainen as Vera's mother

Awards
In 2013, the film received the Russian National Movie Awards as the Best Russian Comedy of the Year.

References

External links 

 
 8 First Dates on Kvartal-95 Studio 

2012 films
2010s Russian-language films
2012 romantic comedy films
Russian romantic comedy films
Ukrainian romantic comedy films
Russian-language Ukrainian films
Volodymyr Zelenskyy films